Padirac is a commune in the Lot department in south-western France.

Population

Notable people
 

Armand Bouat (1873—1929), politician and merchant

See also
Padirac Cave
Communes of the Lot department

References

Communes of Lot (department)